Wolfgang Troßbach (24 August 1927 – 5 December 2021) was a German hurdler. He competed in the men's 110 metres hurdles at the 1952 Summer Olympics. Troßbach died in Bergisch Gladbach on 5 December 2021, at the age of 94.

References

External links
 

1927 births
2021 deaths
Athletes from Berlin
Athletes (track and field) at the 1952 Summer Olympics
German male hurdlers
Olympic athletes of Germany